Toomes Creek is a stream in the U.S. state of California.

Toomes Creek was named after Albert G. Toomes, a local landowner.

References

Rivers of California
Rivers of Tehama County, California